Vasko Boev (born 24 July 1988 in Varna)  is a Bulgarian footballer who currently plays as a midfielder for Ustrem Donchevo. He is a defensive midfielder.

Career
Boev was raised in Spartak Varna's youth teams and made his debut in the A PFG on 12 August 2007 in the 2:2 draw with Botev Plovdiv. In 2013 he retired due injury, but a year later he returned in play for the amateur side Atletic Provadia.

On 10 January 2018 Boev rejoined his youth club Spartak Varna coming from Dobrudzha Dobrich.

References

External links
 
 

1988 births
Living people
Bulgarian footballers
First Professional Football League (Bulgaria) players
PFC Spartak Varna players
PFC Kaliakra Kavarna players

Association football midfielders